Farnworth Grammar School was a grammar school founded in 1715 at Farnworth, Lancashire.

The school was first established at Moses Gate and educated boys. It relocated to Bolton Road in 1922 and became coeducational at the same time. It closed in 1982.

Former pupils
Alan Ball, Jr. footballer 
Ian Ramsey, Anglican bishop
Laurence Robertson MP
Kenneth Wolstenholme, commentator

Notes

Defunct grammar schools in England
1715 establishments in England
Educational institutions established in 1715
People educated at Farnworth Grammar School
Educational institutions disestablished in 1982
Defunct schools in Lancashire
Farnworth